The Athens Demos is the name of two compilations of demos recorded by R.E.M. and included as bonus discs with re-releases of their albums:

Fables of the Reconstruction (originally released in 1985, re-released in 2010)
Lifes Rich Pageant (originally released in 1986, re-released in 2011)

2010 albums
2011 albums
Demo albums
R.E.M. albums
I.R.S. Records albums